Conrad Trubenbach (November 4, 1882 – June 30, 1961) was an American swimmer. He competed in two events at the 1908 Summer Olympics: Men's 100 metres freestyle and Men's 400 meter Freestyle.

In 1905, Trubenback was the IC4A swim champion at Columbia University.  From 1905 to 1910, he played for the New York AC water polo team.  Trubenbach later became President of the Perey Turnstile Company in New York.

References

External links
 

1882 births
1961 deaths
American male water polo players
Olympic swimmers of the United States
Swimmers at the 1908 Summer Olympics
Swimmers from San Francisco
American male freestyle swimmers